Imran Butt can refer to:

 Imran Butt (cricketer) (born 1995), Pakistani cricketer
 Imran Butt (field hockey) (born 1988), Pakistani field hockey player